Samuel Hamilton Kaufman (October 26, 1893 – May 5, 1960) was a United States district judge of the United States District Court for the Southern District of New York.

Education and career

Born in New York City, New York in a Jewish family, Kaufman received a Bachelor of Laws from the New York University School of Law in 1917. He served in the United States Army during World War I. He was in private practice of law in New York City from 1918 to 1948. He was special assistant to the United States Attorney General from 1935 to 1936. He was special counsel for the Federal Communications Commission from 1937 to 1938. He was associate general counsel for the Joint Congressional Committee Investigating Pearl Harbor in 1946.

Federal judicial service

Kaufman received a recess appointment from President Harry S. Truman on June 22, 1948, to a seat on the United States District Court for the Southern District of New York vacated by Judge John Bright. He was nominated to the same seat by President Truman on January 13, 1949. He was confirmed by the United States Senate on January 31, 1949, and received his commission on February 2, 1949. He assumed senior status due to a certified disability on July 31, 1955. His service was terminated on May 5, 1960, due to his death in New York City.

See also
 List of Jewish American jurists

References

Sources
 

1893 births
1960 deaths
Lawyers from New York City
Judges of the United States District Court for the Southern District of New York
United States district court judges appointed by Harry S. Truman
20th-century American judges
New York University School of Law alumni